Century Child is the fourth studio album by Finnish symphonic metal band Nightwish. It was released in 2002 through Spinefarm Records in Finland, Drakkar Entertainment in the rest of Europe, Century Media Records in the US, and Toy's Factory in Japan. It is the first album which features former bassist and male vocalist Marko Hietala. It is also the first Nightwish album to feature an orchestra.

Spinefarm Records released a 2-CD special edition of the album in 2002. It includes liner art with the band members' signatures, and a Video CD containing the music video for their cover of Gary Moore's "Over the Hills and Far Away". In addition, the booklet contains an ID code that allows the owner to download the entire album and three extra tracks from the Internet for a limited time. The bonus tracks are "Nightwish", "The Forever Moments" and "Etiäinen", all from the band's first demo of 1996.

The album was certified double platinum in Finland with more than 60,000 sold copies, the second best selling album of 2002 in Finland. Century Child has sold more than 80,000 copies in Finland alone.

Track listing

Personnel
Credits for Century Child adapted from liner notes.

Nightwish
Tarja Turunen – lead vocals
Tuomas Holopainen – keyboards, art direction
Emppu Vuorinen – guitars
Marko Hietala – bass, male vocals on tracks 3, 5, 8, 9, backing vocals on track 4 & 10
Jukka Nevalainen – drums, percussion

Additional musicians
Joensuu City Orchestra – orchestra
Juha Ikonen – orchestra leader
Riku Niemi – orchestra and choir conductor, orchestra and choir arrangements, orchestra and choir producer
Mongo Aaltonen – orchestral percussion
St. Thomas Chorus of Helsinki – choir vocals
Hilkka Kangasniemi – choirmaster
Sam Hardwick – spoken words on "Bless the Child" and "Beauty of the Beast"
Kristiina Ilmonen – tin whistle
GME choir – additional noise

Production
Tero "TeeCee" Kinnunen – producer
Mikko Karmila – mixing
Mika Jussila – mastering
Veijo Laine – orchestra and choir arrangements, orchestra and choir producer
Terhi Kallio – orchestra engineering
Markus Mayer – cover art
Spelltone – layout
Hilkka Kangasniemi – choirmaster

Charts

Weekly charts

Year-end charts

Singles

Certifications

References

Bibliography

External links
Nightwish's Official Website

Nightwish albums
2002 albums
Spinefarm Records albums
Century Media Records albums